Rainsborough, or spelling variations, may refer to:

Thomas Rainsborough (1610–1648), Colonel in the English Civil War, brother of William Rainborowe
William Rainborowe (died 1673), Captain and then Major in the English Civil War, brother of Thomas Rainsborough
William Rainsborough (1587–1642), English Vice-Admiral in the Royal Navy, and ambassador, their father

See also
Rainsboro, Ohio